The People's Opposition Bloc of Natalia Vitrenko, was a political alliance in Ukraine led by Natalia Vitrenko.

It consisted of:
Progressive Socialist Party of Ukraine (Progresivna Sotsyalistychna Partiya Ukrayiny)
Party "Rus'-Ukrainian Union" (Partiya "Rus'ko-Ukrayins'kyj Soyuz" (Rus'))

Conclusion
At the parliamentary election, 26 March 2006, it won 2.93% of the popular vote (less than the 3% electoral threshold, and hence no seats).

References

Defunct political party alliances in Ukraine
Russian political parties in Ukraine